Sprung (Music from and Inspired by the Motion Picture) is a soundtrack to the 1997 comedy film Sprung. It is composed of 17 swingbeat and hip hop tracks by artists ranging from Canibus to Aaliyah.

Track listing 
"Who You Wit" by Jay-Z (S. Carter)
"Let Me Know" by Keystone (A. Armer, R. Badazz, M. Kinchen, L. Kinchen, L. Smith)
"Group Home Family" by Canibus, Lost Boyz and Panama P.I. (G. Williams, T. Kelly, Panama P.I.)
"I Don't Know" by Next Level and K-Borne (K-Borne, The Whole 9 (J. Rhone, O. Haynes), M. Richmond, R. Scrivens, M. Stewart, H. Tate, A. Tate, J. Tate)
"Move On (I'm Leaving)" by John Forté and Pras (J. Forté, M. Moir, S. Michel, N. Renee)
"If It Ain't Love" by Keystone (Will Gardner, Tyrone Taylor)
"One in a Million (Remix)" by Aaliyah featuring Ginuwine (M. Elliot, T. Mosley)
"I Still Love You" by Monifah (Big Bub, T. Dofat, Heavy D.)
"Since You've Gone Away (The Lockdown Anthem)" by Bonnie & Clyde (A. Johnson, A. Martin, I. Matias, K. Muchita)
"2 Nite's the Nite" by Mr. Dalvin (D. DeGrate, M. Ferguson)
"Goal Tendin'" by E-40 (E. Stevens)
"Freak" by Money Boss Players (E. Faison, S. Hamilton, A. Hendricks, M. Holt, M. Richardson, B. Tweedy)
"Let's Get It Started" by G-Ratz (J. Calloway, S. Davis, T. Emanuel, J. Gist, A. Smith, J. Walters)
"Bounce" by Noggin Nodders (G. Clinton, B. Collins, P. Laster, C. Maitlin, A. Mouzon, G. Shider)
"Don't Ask My Neighbor" by Tisha Campbell and Tichina Arnold (S. Scarborough)
"The Secret Garden" by Quincy Jones (E. DeBarge, S. Garrett, Q. Jones, R. Temperton)
"I Want Your Love" by Stanley Clarke (S. Clarke, V. Colapietro, N. Dinkens, S. Gonder)

Charts

Weekly charts

Year-end charts

References

Hip hop soundtracks
1997 soundtrack albums
New jack swing albums
Comedy film soundtracks